Dewberry is a group of species in the genus Rubus, closely related to the blackberries.

Dewberry may also refer to:

Plants
 Swamp dewberry (Rubus hispidus), also known as a bristly dewberry
 Rubus ursinus, California dewberry, more commonly called the California or Pacific blackberry

Places
 Dewberry, Alberta, a village
 Dewberry, Indiana, an unincorporated community
 Dewberry Island, an island in Espiritu Santo Bay in Calhoun County, Texas

People
 Charley Dewberry, American science writer
 Donna Dewberry (born 1953), American painter and author
 Frederick L. Dewberry (1921-1990),  American politician
 John Dewberry, American football quarterback
 Michelle Dewberry (born 1979), British businesswoman and contestant
 Thomas E. Dewberry (born 1951), American politician
 William Dewberry (1874-1946), African-American baseball pitcher

Other uses
 Dewberry (architecture firm), an American architecture and engineering firm that contributed to building General Wayne A. Downing Peoria International Airport
 Dewberry (Beaverdam, Virginia), a building on the National Register of Historic Places

See also
 Dewsbury (disambiguation)